Max Park is a Rubik's Cube speedsolver who is currently tied 2nd place for the world record average of five 3×3×3 solves (by WCA standards), 4.86 seconds, set on the 24th of September 2022. Park first held this record from 23 April 2017 to 28 June 2017 and was the only cuber other than Feliks Zemdegs to hold the record between 27 September 2009 and 5 June 2021. Park has also set multiple world records in speedsolving in the 4×4×4, 5×5×5, 6×6×6, and 7×7×7 cubes, and the 3×3×3 One-Handed events. As of 28 January 2023, he has won 401 total events in World Cube Association competitions.

Early life 
Max Park was born on November 28, 2001, in Cerritos, California. When Park was two years old, he was diagnosed with moderate to severe autism. His parents, Miki and Schwan Park, were told that he might need lifelong care. Park's motor skills were severely impaired because of his autism and so his mother, Miki Park, taught Park how to solve a Rubik's cube that he had taken interest in. He began learning speedcubing and performing at competitions. At his second competition, he came in first place in the 6×6×6 event. He made progress in social development by waiting in a queue and mirroring body language on a podium at competitions.

Career 
Park previously held the world record for average of five 3×3×3 solves with a 4.86 second average set at Marshall Cubing September 2022 on the 24th of the month.

Park previously held the world record for average of five 3×3×3 solves with one hand at 9.02 seconds, set on 12 March 2022 at Florida Spring B 2022. This record was broken by Patrick Ponce with an average of 8.70 seconds. Park was the first person to achieve a sub-10 second one-handed average in competition, with an average of 9.99 seconds on 13 January 2018 at Thanks Four The Invite 2018. Park also holds the world record single for one-handed solving at 6.20 seconds set at Bay Area Speedcubin' 20 2019, breaking one of the longest-standing cubing world records which was held by Feliks Zemdegs.

Park holds the world records for single and average of five 4×4×4 solves with 16.79 seconds and 19.88 seconds, both set on April 3, 2022, at Bay Area Speedcubin' 29 PM 2022.

Park holds the world records for single and average of five 5×5×5 solves with 33.02 seconds and 38.42 seconds, both set at Florida Big & Blind Time 2022.  Prior to Park's first 5×5×5 record, the records for single and the average of five 5×5×5 solves had been held by Feliks Zemdegs, who had improved the two records a combined 32 times. Park is the only cuber other than Zemdegs to have set either 5×5×5 record since 11 August 2012.

Park holds the world records for single and mean of three 6×6×6 solves: 59.74 seconds and 1 minute, 9.23 seconds, both set at CubingUSA Southeast Championship 2022.

Park holds the world records for single and mean of three 7×7×7 solves: 1 minute, 40.89 seconds and 1 minute, 46.57 seconds, set at Cubing Nationals 2019 and Houston Winter 2020 respectively.

Park is the 2-time US National Champion in 3×3×3, 3-time champion in 4×4×4, 2-time champion in 5×5×5, 2018 champion in 6×6×6, 2018 champion in 7×7×7, and 2-time champion in 3×3×3 One-Handed.

At the World Championship 2017 in Paris, Park won 3×3×3 and 3×3×3 one-handed and placed 3rd in 5×5×5 and 6×6×6.

At the World Championship 2019 in Melbourne, Park won 4×4×4, 5×5×5, 6×6×6, 7×7×7, and 3×3×3 one-handed.  Park finished 4th in the 3×3×3 final after winning the first three rounds.

Park is one of nine cubers to have solved the 3×3×3 in less than 5 seconds in competition at least five times, and one of the two cubers to have achieved at least five sub-6 second averages of five 3×3×3 solves in competition.

In 2020, Max appeared in the Netflix documentary The Speed Cubers, a film about speedcubing largely focusing on Feliks Zemdegs and Max Park and their speedcubing journey.

Notable WCA Rankings

References

Living people
American speedcubers
2001 births
People on the autism spectrum